The Christian Democratic Party is a Christian democratic party in El Salvador. After being officially disbanded by the Supreme Court in 2011, it continued to work under the name of Party of Hope, before re-taking its original name in 2012.

In the legislative elections, held on 16 March 2003, the party won 7.3% of the popular vote and 5 out of 84 seats in the Legislative Assembly. In the presidential election of 21 March 2004, the PDC supported Héctor Silva Argüello of the United Democratic Centre, who won 3% of the vote. In the 12 March 2006 legislative election, the party won 6.8% of the popular vote and 6 out of 84 seats. The party had a similar level of support for the 2009 legislative elections, winning 6% of the vote and 5 seats.

History
The Christian Democratic Party is the longest lasting of El Salvador's two leading parties. It was the left-of-center party while the Party of National Conciliation was right-of-center. With the rise of more socialist and communist parties in El Salvador, it became more of a centrist party. During the civil war, many leaders of the PDC who were more left-leaning were killed or disappeared, and the party moved to the right.

In 1989 Christian Democrat José Napoleón Duarte was the first Salvadoran president to democratically hand over power to a successor. The party's position has since shrunk with the rise of ARENA and FMLN.

However, since no party held a majority in the legislature, it could be seen as effectively holding the balance of power. It often sided with ARENA and supported their effort to ratify the Central American Free Trade Agreement and pass a law supposedly aimed at fighting terrorism.

They struggled to pick a presidential candidate for 2009. The vice presidential candidate lives in the United States and has campaigned promising to give Salvadorans abroad the opportunity to vote in future presidential elections.

While the party was technically to be disbanded after the 2004 election, in which its candidate did not gather the necessary 3% of the vote, it was allowed to hold on to its registration by decree; this decree was declared unconstitutional on 30 April 2011, and the party was thus disbanded.

The PDC was effectively replaced by the Party of Hope, which was registered with the National Electoral Tribunal in October 2011. In September 2012 the Party of Hope asked for its name to be changed back to Christian Democratic Party, which was allowed by the Electoral Tribunal.

Electoral history

Presidential elections

Note 
In the 1982 election Álvaro Magaña was elected by the Legislative Assembly

Legislative Assembly elections 

1As part of Union of Democratic Parties, an alliance of the Renovating Action Party, the Christian Democratic Party and the Social Democrat Party.

2As part of National Opposing Union, an alliance of the Christian Democratic Party, the National Revolutionary Movement and the Nationalist Democratic Union

External links 
 Website of the party

References

Catholic political parties
Christian democratic parties in North America
Political parties in El Salvador
Salvadoran Civil War
Political parties established in 1960
1960 establishments in El Salvador